Postplatyptilia camptosphena is a moth of the family Pterophoridae. It is known from Argentina.

The wingspan is 15–22 mm. Adults are on wing from November to February.

References

camptosphena
Moths described in 1931